Northeast is one of the six multi-member constituencies of the Althing, the national legislature of Iceland. The constituency was established as Northeastern in 1959 following the nationwide extension of proportional representation for elections to the Althing.  It was renamed Northeast in 2003 when most of the Eastern constituency was merged into the Northeastern constituency following the re-organisation of constituencies across Iceland. Northeast consists of the regions of Eastern and Northeastern. The constituency currently elects nine of the 63 members of the Althing using the open party-list proportional representation electoral system. At the 2021 parliamentary election it had 29,847 registered electors.

Electoral system
Northeast currently elects nine of the 63 members of the Althing using the open party-list proportional representation electoral system. Constituency seats are allocated using the D'Hondt method. Compensatory seats (equalisation seas) are calculated based on the national vote and are allocated using the D'Hondt method at the constituency level. Only parties that reach the 5% national threshold compete for compensatory seats.

Election results

Summary

(Excludes compensatory seats.)

Detailed

2020s

2021
Results of the 2021 parliamentary election held on 25 September 2021:

The following candidates were elected:
Berglind Ósk Guðmundsdóttir (D), 3,263.75 votes; Bjarkey Gunnarsdóttir (V), 3,013.50 votes; Ingibjörg Ólöf Isaksen (B), 5,981.33 votes; Jakob Frímann Magnússon (F), 2,004.00 votes; Jódís Skúladóttir (V), 2,284.50 votes; Líneik Anna Sævarsdóttir (B), 4,998.67 votes; Logi Már Einarsson (S), 2,454.33 votes; Njáll Trausti Friðbertsson (D), 4,291.75 votes; Sigmundur Davíð Gunnlaugsson (M), 2,080.33 votes; and Þórarinn Ingi Pétursson (B), 4,016.33 votes.

2010s

2017
Results of the 2017 parliamentary election held on 28 October 2017:

The following candidates were elected:
Albertína Friðbjörg Elíasdóttir (S), 2,454.75 votes; Anna Kolbrún Árnadóttir (M), 3,292.50 votes; Bjarkey Gunnarsdóttir (V), 3,582.50 votes; Kristján Þór Júlíusson (D), 4,736.25 votes; Líneik Anna Sævarsdóttir (B), 2,530.25 votes; Logi Már Einarsson (S), 3,268.00 votes; Njáll Trausti Friðbertsson (D), 3,585.25 votes; Sigmundur Davíð Gunnlaugsson (M), 4,368.00 votes; Steingrímur J. Sigfússon (V), 4,450.00 votes; and Þórunn Egilsdóttir (B), 3,369.50 votes.

2016
Results of the 2016 parliamentary election held on 29 October 2016:

The following candidates were elected:
Benedikt Jóhannesson (C), 1,467.33 votes; Bjarkey Gunnarsdóttir (V), 3,433.50 votes; Einar Aðalsteinn Brynjólfsson (P), 2,258.67 votes; Kristján Þór Júlíusson (D), 5,958.83 votes; Logi Már Einarsson (S), 1,800.67 votes; Njáll Trausti Friðbertsson (D), 4,997.00 votes; Sigmundur Davíð Gunnlaugsson (B), 3,729.50 votes; Steingrímur J. Sigfússon (V), 4,392.00 votes; Valgerður Gunnarsdóttir (D), 4,006.83 votes; and Þórunn Egilsdóttir (B), 3,564.25 votes.

2013
Results of the 2013 parliamentary election held on 27 April 2013:

The following candidates were elected:
Bjarkey Gunnarsdóttir (V), 2,795.0 votes; Brynhildur Pétursdóttir (A), 1,536.0 votes; Höskuldur Þórhallsson (B), 7,119.1 votes; Kristján L. Möller (S), 2,484.7 votes; Kristján Þór Júlíusson (D), 5,295.5 votes; Líneik Anna Sævarsdóttir (B), 6,133.3 votes; Sigmundur Davíð Gunnlaugsson (B), 8,129.6 votes; Steingrímur J. Sigfússon (V), 3,716.8 votes; Valgerður Gunnarsdóttir (D), 3,996.3 votes; and Þórunn Egilsdóttir (B), 5,116.9 votes.

2000s

2009
Results of the 2009 parliamentary election held on 25 April 2009:

The following candidates were elected:
Birkir Jón Jónsson (B), 5,600.2 votes; Björn Valur Gíslason (V), 4,615.5 votes; Höskuldur Þórhallsson (B), 4,495.0 votes; Jónína Rós Guðmundsdóttir (S), 3,557.3 votes; Kristján L. Möller (S), 5,066.5 votes; Kristján Þór Júlíusson (D), 3,763.5 votes; Sigmundur Ernir Rúnarsson (S), 4,331.2 votes; Steingrímur J. Sigfússon (V), 6,925.5 votes; Tryggvi Þór Herbertsson (D), 3,017.5 votes; and Þuríður Backman (V), 5,675.0 votes.

2007
Results of the 2007 parliamentary election held on 12 May 2007:

The following candidates were elected:
Arnbjörg Sveinsdóttir (D), 5,412.0 votes; Birkir Jón Jónsson (B), 4,760.8 votes; Einar Már Sigurðarson (S), 3,621.0 votes; Höskuldur Þórhallsson (B), 3,833.3 votes; Kristján L. Möller (S), 4,798.7 votes; Kristján Þór Júlíusson (D), 6,432.7 votes; Ólöf Nordal (D), 4,358.5 votes; Steingrímur J. Sigfússon (V), 4,552.7 votes; Valgerður Sverrisdóttir (B), 5,628.2 votes; and Þuríður Backman (V), 3,401.5 votes.

2003
Results of the 2003 parliamentary election held on 10 May 2003:

The following candidates were elected:
Birkir Jón Jónsson (B), 4,823.5 votes; Dagný Jónsdóttir (B), 5,792.9 votes; Einar Már Sigurðarson (S), 4,121.2 votes; Halldór Blöndal (D), 5,325.5 votes; Jón Kristjánsson (B), 6,737.0 votes; Kristján L. Möller (S), 5,462.2 votes; Steingrímur J. Sigfússon (U), 3,329.0 votes; Tómas Ingi Olrich (D), 4,036.0 votes; Valgerður Sverrisdóttir (B), 7,646.0 votes; and Þuríður Backman (U), 2,492.0 votes.

1990s

1999
Results of the 1999 parliamentary election held on 8 May 1999:

The following candidates were elected:
Árni Steinar Jóhannsson (U), 3,476 votes; Halldór Blöndal (D), 4,669 votes; Steingrímur J. Sigfússon (U), 3,480 votes; Svanfríður Jónasdóttir (S), 2,596 votes; Tómas Ingi Olrich (D), 4,691 votes; and Valgerður Sverrisdóttir (B), 4,458 votes.

1995
Results of the 1995 parliamentary election held on 8 April 1995:

The following candidates were elected:
Guðmundur Kristján Bjarnason (B), 5,965 votes; Halldór Blöndal (D), 4,587 votes; Steingrímur J. Sigfússon (G), 2,715 votes; Svanfríður Jónasdóttir (J), 1,408 votes; Tómas Ingi Olrich (D), 4,568 votes; and Valgerður Sverrisdóttir (B), 5,962 votes.

1991
Results of the 1991 parliamentary election held on 20 April 1991:

The following candidates were elected:
Guðmundur Kristján Bjarnason (B), 5,354 votes; Halldór Blöndal (D), 3,232 votes; Jóhannes Geir Sigurgeirsson (B), 5,328 votes; Sigbjörn Gunnarsson (A), 1,475 votes; Steingrímur J. Sigfússon (G), 2,788 votes; Tómas Ingi Olrich (D), 3,700 votes; and Valgerður Sverrisdóttir (B), 5,340 votes.

1980s

1987
Results of the 1987 parliamentary election held on 25 April 1987:

The following candidates were elected:
Árni Gunnarsson (A), 2,211 votes; Guðmundur Kristján Bjarnason (B), 3,874 votes; Halldór Blöndal (D), 3,182 votes; Málfríður Sigurðardóttir (V), 986 votes; Stefán Valgeirsson (J), 1,889 votes; Steingrímur J. Sigfússon (G), 2,049 votes; and Valgerður Sverrisdóttir (B), 3,874 votes.

1983
Results of the 1983 parliamentary election held on 23 April 1983:

The following candidates were elected:
Guðmundur Kristján Bjarnason (B), 3,971 votes; Halldór Blöndal (D), 3,412 votes; Ingvar Gíslason (B), 4,620 votes; Kolbrún Jónsdóttir (C), 623 votes; Lárus Jónsson (D), 3,723 votes; Stefán Valgeirsson (B), 4,341 votes; and Steingrímur J. Sigfússon (G), 2,308 votes.

1970s

1979
Results of the 1979 parliamentary election held on 2 and 3 December 1979:

The following candidates were elected:
Árni Gunnarsson (A), 1,784 votes; Guðmundur Kristján Bjarnason (B), 4,916 votes; Halldór Blöndal (D), 2,527 votes; Ingvar Gíslason (B), 5,878 votes; Lárus Jónsson (D), 2,757 votes; Stefán Jónsson (G), 2,136 votes; and Stefán Valgeirsson (B), 5,394 votes.

1978
Results of the 1978 parliamentary election held on 25 June 1978:

The following candidates were elected:
Árni Gunnarsson (A), 2,635 votes; Bragi Sigurjónsson (A), 2,857 votes; Ingvar Gíslason (B), 4,146 votes; Jón G. Sólnes (D), 2,901 votes; Lárus Jónsson (D), 2,695 votes; Stefán Jónsson (G), 2,573 votes; and Stefán Valgeirsson (B), 3,803 votes.

1974
Results of the 1974 parliamentary election held on 30 June 1974:

The following candidates were elected:
Ingi Tryggvason (B), 3,974 votes; Ingvar Gíslason (B), 4,802 votes; Jón G. Sólnes (D), 3,656 votes; Lárus Jónsson (D), 3,354 votes; Stefán Jónsson (G), 1,727 votes; and Stefán Valgeirsson (B), 4,409 votes.

1971
Results of the 1971 parliamentary election held on 13 June 1971:

The following candidates were elected:
Björn Jónsson (F), 1,388 votes; Gísli Guðmundsson (B), 4,660 votes; Ingvar Gíslason (B), 4,280 votes; Lárus Jónsson (D), 2,690 votes; Magnús Jónsson (D), 2,937 votes; and Stefán Valgeirsson (B), 3,887 votes.

1960s

1967
Results of the 1967 parliamentary election held on 11 June 1967:

The following candidates were elected:
Bjartmar Guðmundsson (D), 1,000 votes; Björn Jónsson (G), 1,568 votes; Bragi Sigurjónsson (A), 1,357 votes; Gísli Guðmundsson (B), 4,524 votes; Ingvar Gíslason (B), 4,145 votes; Jónas G. Rafnar (D), 2,993 votes; Magnús Jónsson (D), 2,748 votes; and Stefán Valgeirsson (B), 3,752 votes.

1963
Results of the 1963 parliamentary election held on 9 June 1963:

The following candidates were elected:
Bjartmar Guðmundsson (D), 952 votes; Björn Jónsson (G), 1,620 votes; Gísli Guðmundsson (B), 4,152 votes; Ingvar Gíslason (B), 3,770 votes; Jónas G. Rafnar (D), 2,820 votes; Karl Kristjánson (B), 4,526 votes; and Magnús Jónsson (D), 2,586 votes.

1950s

October 1959
Results of the October 1959 parliamentary election held on 25 and 26 October 1959:

The following candidates were elected:
Bjartmar Guðmundsson (D), 882 votes; Björn Jónsson (G), 1,371 votes; Friðjón Skarphéðinsson (A), 1,045 votes; Garðar Halldórsson (B), 3,456 votes; Gísli Guðmundsson (B), 3,816 votes; Jónas G. Rafnar (D), 2,644 votes; Karl Kristjánson (B), 4,160 votes; and Magnús Jónsson (D), 2,424 votes.

References

1959 establishments in Iceland
Althing constituencies
Constituencies established in 1959
Althing constituency
Althing constituency